God Exists, Her Name Is Petrunija, also spelt Petrunya in English translation, is a 2019 Macedonian drama film directed by Teona Strugar Mitevska. It tells the story of a woman who wins a local contest, but because its usually reserved for men she becomes ostracised for it. It was selected to compete for the Golden Bear award at the 69th Berlin International Film Festival, and won the LUX Prize and several other awards, as well as being nominated for others.

Cast
 Zorica Nusheva as Petrunija
 Labina Mitevska as Journalist Slavica
 Stefan Vujisic as Younger Officer Darko
 Suad Begovski as The Priest

Awards
2019 LUX Prize
German Film Guild and Ecumenical Prizes at the Berlin Film Festival

References

External links
 

2019 films
2019 drama films
Macedonian drama films
Macedonian-language films
Films set in North Macedonia